Susanne Rust (born Briarcliff Manor, New York) is an American investigative journalist.

She graduated from Barnard College with a bachelor's degree, from University of Wisconsin–Madison, with an MS in 1999.
In 2003, she started as a science reporter at the Milwaukee Journal Sentinel. She with Meg Kissinger investigated Bisphenol A.
She was a John S. Knight Fellow at Stanford University.
Rust currently works at Columbia University's Graduate School of Journalism, where she directs the Energy and Environment Reporting Project. She was an environmental reporter at California Watch, a project of the Center for Investigative Reporting until 2014.

Awards
 2009 Pulitzer Prize for Investigative Reporting finalist 
 2008 George Polk Award
 2008 John B. Oakes award for distinguished environmental reporting 
 Scripps Howard National Journalism award
 2009 Grantham award of special merit

Bibliography

References

External links
Journalist's Twitter
"Chemical Fallout", a series of articles from Milwaukee Wisconsin Journal Sentinel, to many of which Rust contributed.
"Exposé on the Journal: Chemicals In Our Food", Bill Moyers' Journal
Bill Moyers: Transcript May 23, 2008
"A talk with BPA muckraker Susanne Rust", MSU, April 7, 2009
2009 Grantham Prize Award Presentation to Susanne Rust and Meg Kissinger Part 1 of 2 
"Science Suppressed: How America became obsessed with BPA"

Living people
American women journalists
Barnard College alumni
University of Wisconsin–Madison School of Journalism & Mass Communication alumni
George Polk Award recipients
Year of birth missing (living people)
Milwaukee Journal Sentinel people
People from Briarcliff Manor, New York
Discover (magazine) people
21st-century American women